Open in 1949 the Provvidenti Station was the railway station that served the municipality of Provvidenti (about 4 km away).

Now is only a Level crossing on the Termoli-Campobasso and Termoli–Venafro, the Level crossing is active but the station (fermata ferroviaria in Italian ) is dismantled.

References

This article is based upon a translation of the Italian language version as at May 2017.

Railway stations in Molise